Natasa Rybanska (born April 10, 2000) is a Slovak-born Hungarian water polo player. At the 2020 Summer Olympics she competed for the Hungary women's national water polo team in the women's tournament.

She participated at the 2019 World Women's Junior Water Polo, 2019 FINA World Championships, 2019 FINA Women's Water Polo World League, 2020 FINA Women's Water Polo World League.

References

External links
 
 Natasa Rybanska at Global Sports Archive
 Nataša Rybanská: Great Preparation for the Olympic Qualification Tournament

2000 births
Living people
Hungarian female water polo players
Water polo players at the 2020 Summer Olympics
Sportspeople from Piešťany
Medalists at the 2020 Summer Olympics
Olympic bronze medalists for Hungary in water polo
World Aquatics Championships medalists in water polo
21st-century Hungarian women